The 1931 Labour Party leadership election took place after the expulsion of incumbent Leader Ramsay MacDonald from the Labour Party. As Labour leader, MacDonald had been prime minister in 1924 and from 1929 to 1931, until he became head of a National Government that was opposed by the bulk of the Labour Party. MacDonald was then expelled from the party.

Arthur Henderson was the only candidate who stood, and was elected Leader unopposed by the Parliamentary Labour Party.

Notes

References
 

1931
Labour Party leadership
Labour Party leadership election
Labour Party (UK) leadership election
Ramsay MacDonald
Labour Party leadership election